Stannis Baratheon is a fictional character in the A Song of Ice and Fire series of epic fantasy novels by American author George R. R. Martin, and its television adaptation Game of Thrones. He is the second son of Steffon Baratheon and Cassana Estermont, as well as the brother of Robert – lord of the Seven Kingdoms, and Renly – lord of Storm's End. He is the Lord of Dragonstone, and after his elder brother's death, becomes a claimant to the Iron Throne of Westeros and a key player in the subsequent civil war. Stannis's goals are frequently impeded by his lack of manpower and resources, owing to his unpopularity with other noble houses. He must therefore rely on the counsel of the foreign priestess Melisandre and his right-hand man, lowborn smuggler Davos Seaworth, who he later promotes to Hand of the King. Stannis often struggles to escape the shadow of his two more overtly charismatic brothers, particularly Robert.

Though first mentioned in 1996's A Game of Thrones, Stannis formally appeared in A Clash of Kings (1998), A Storm of Swords (2000) and A Dance with Dragons (2011).  In December 2011, Martin posted a sample chapter from the yet-unfinished The Winds of Winter, told from Theon Greyjoy's viewpoint, which confirmed Stannis' return in the sixth book.

Stannis is portrayed by English actor Stephen Dillane in the HBO television adaptation of the series, who has received significant critical praise for his performance. Stannis is a divisive character among fans of the books and television show alike, enjoying both great popularity for his dedication to justice and dark horse status, as well as opposition for his unrelenting attitude towards the Iron Throne. He has earned particular attention for the differences in his characterization between the novels and show, particularly during season five.

Character description 
Stannis Baratheon is the younger brother of King Robert and older brother of Renly. He is portrayed as a brooding and humorless man with a harsh but fair sense of duty and justice whose dour demeanor is often off-putting in comparison to his two more charismatic brothers. He is renowned as a skilled and prescient military commander. Although he is initially said to be extremely stubborn and inflexible, in later books he has shown some ability to use diplomacy and deception to achieve his goals.

Background
Stannis was born the second of Steffon Baratheon and Cassana Estermont's three sons and in his youth was constantly overshadowed Robert.  When Stannis was 14, he witnessed his parents' death in a shipwreck off the coast of House Baratheon's castle, Storm's End, and subsequently lost his faith in the Seven Gods.

During Robert's Rebellion, a teenage Stannis holds Storm's End in Robert's absence, but is besieged by Mace Tyrell and Paxter Redwyne for the best part of the year. Stannis' garrison avoids starvation thanks only to the smuggler Davos Seaworth, who evades the blockade by the Redwyne fleet to bring the Baratheon soldiers a cargo of onions and fish.  When Eddard Stark arrives to lift the siege, Stannis knights Davos as reward for his aid, but also insists that Davos have four fingers removed as punishment for his years of illegal smuggling; Davos agrees, on the condition that Stannis removes the fingers himself.  Stannis is subsequently tasked with building a new royal fleet to assault Dragonstone and capture the island, but arrives to find that Aerys II Targaryen's children Viserys and the newborn Daenerys had fled. Robert names Stannis Lord of Dragonstone, giving him control over the islands of Blackwater Bay and the nearby peninsula of Massey's Hook - but Stannis feels slighted, as their younger brother Renly is named Lord of Storm's End, giving him control over the entirety of the Stormlands. 

Several years later, Stannis is married to Lady Selyse Florent, but Robert soiled their wedding bed by deflowering Selyse's cousin Delena, further insulting Stannis. Stannis and Selyse have a single daughter together, Shireen, who nearly dies in infancy after contracting greyscale and is left disfigured.  Stannis, who is named Robert's Master of Ships, destroys the Iron Fleet under the command of Victarion Greyjoy at Fair Isle during the Greyjoy Rebellion and leads the conquest of Great Wyk, the largest of the Iron Islands, adding to his significant military resume.

At the beginning of the first novel A Game of Thrones, Stannis comes to suspect that Robert's children with Cersei Lannister are not actually his. He suspects that Robert will not believe his word alone, so he reveals his suspicions to Robert's Hand of the King and trusted friend, Lord Jon Arryn. The two discover several of Robert's bastard children in King's Landing and begin to gather proof of the bastardy of Cersei's children. Jon Arryn agrees to foster his young son and heir, Robert Arryn, at Dragonstone. However, Jon Arryn dies unexpectedly. Stannis suspects that the Lannisters assassinated Jon Arryn, so he immediately leaves the capital for Dragonstone.

Appearance and personality
Stannis is frequently described as a large and sinewy man that towers over others, such as Davos Seaworth and Jon Snow, a Baratheon trait. He lacks the long black hair of his brothers, and is instead balding, although he keeps a close-cropped beard of the signature Baratheon black. His face is described as 'tight like cured leather' with hollow, gaunt cheeks. His eyes are described by Asha Greyjoy as 'deep, sunken pits', with a powerful stare that suggests an 'iron ferocity'.

Stannis' most prominent characteristics are his flinty and austere demeanor, unrelenting stubbornness, and powerful sense of duty and justice, the latter of which he is notorious for throughout Westeros. He rarely forgives a slight; Jon Snow once comments that "Stannis Baratheon with a grievance was like a mastiff with a bone; he gnawed it down to splinters." His signature tic is grinding his teeth, often in the face of unpleasant or unforeseen circumstances. He is a renowned commander, sailor, and warrior, although he is a better tactician than fighter. Stannis is known for his brusqueness and lack of tact in social situations and finds himself uncomfortable around women, including his own wife. He abhors brothels and once tried to have them banned from King's Landing, which made him unpopular with the smallfolk there. He dresses plainly in dark clothing and is rarely seen without his sword and dagger. Stannis is plagued with bitterness at the lack of respect and affection he has been shown by his older brother King Robert, and even in childhood was described by the Baratheon family maester as "the most unloved of the three"; a "solemn and joyless" child "mature beyond his years". Stannis is an atheist, despite claims that he is being manipulated by the red priestess Melisandre.

Although Stannis suffers from a lack of support and resources during the War of Five Kings, he is frequently described by his adversaries, including Tywin Lannister, as the most dangerous rival claimant. Above all he is characterized by his fearless and uncompromising pursuit of justice and duty - he is described by Varys in this way: "His claim is the true one, he is known for his prowess as a battle commander, and he is utterly without mercy. There is no creature on earth half so terrifying as a truly just man."

Storylines

Novels 
Stannis is not a point of view character in the novels, so his actions are witnessed and interpreted through the eyes of other people, predominantly Davos Seaworth and Jon Snow, and later Asha and Theon Greyjoy.

A Game of Thrones 

When Robert travels to Winterfell to name Eddard as his new Hand, Stannis flees to Dragonstone with his forces, including most of the royal navy. Stannis suspects Cersei's involvement in Jon's death. It is later revealed that the true culprit was Jon's wife Lysa, who was persuaded to poison her husband by her lover, Petyr Baelish. Eddard continues Stannis and Jon's investigations, and discovers that Cersei's children are the products of her incestuous affair with her twin brother Jaime Lannister. After Robert's death, Eddard tries to replace Robert's presumed heir Joffrey Baratheon with Stannis, but loses the political struggle against the Lannisters and is executed.

A Clash of Kings 

Stannis comes under the influence of the red priestess Melisandre, who believes that Stannis is the reincarnation of Azor Ahai, a messianic figure in her faith. Stannis declares himself the one true King; however, most of the Baratheon bannermen support the claim of his younger and more charismatic brother Renly, as does the powerful House Tyrell due to Renly's marriage to Margaery Tyrell. Stannis tries to negotiate with Renly, offering him the chance to become his heir, which Renly rejects, planning to use his superior numbers to destroy Stannis' army the next day. However, Renly is unexpectedly assassinated by a living shadow conjured by Melisandre using Stannis' life force. After his death, many of Renly's bannermen immediately swear allegiance to Stannis, although the Tyrells side with the Lannisters due to their offer to have Margaery marry Joffrey. Renly's protector Brienne of Tarth swears to avenge his death by killing Stannis, but is talked out of it by Catelyn Stark.

Now equipped with the strongest army and navy in Westeros, Stannis attempts to capture the capital city of King's Landing by sea, but many of his men are killed when Tyrion Lannister detonates jars of wildfire in the Blackwater River and burns most of his fleet. Stannis' forces still nearly claim victory, but Lannister and Tyrell reinforcements arrive in time to drive Stannis' men away from King's Landing. However, with the help of Rolland Storm, the Bastard of Nightsong, Stannis flees to Dragonstone to fight another day.

A Storm of Swords 

Stannis retreats to Dragonstone with what is left of his army. He imprisons his Hand Lord Alester Florent, one of his wife's uncles, for trying to offer terms of surrender to the Lannisters. Another of Selyses' uncles, Ser Axell Florent, castellan of Dragonstone, aims to become Stannis' Hand of the King. He suggests a plan to attack Claw Isle in retaliation for Lord Celtigar's bending the knee to Joffrey, but Davos derides an attack on this defenseless island as evil. For this honest counsel Stannis names Davos as his new Hand. Melisandre tells Stannis to burn Edric Storm, one of Robert's bastards, as a sacrifice to raise dragons from Dragonstone. Stannis is conflicted about burning his nephew but uses Edric's blood collected by three leeches to curse the rival kings: Balon Greyjoy, Joffrey Baratheon, and Robb Stark. After Joffrey's, Balon's and Robb's deaths seem to prove the power of king's blood, Stannis considers sacrificing Edric. Davos smuggles Edric off Dragonstone to the Free Cities, and then persuades Stannis to sail to the North and save the Night's Watch from the wildling army.

After Melisandre burns Alester Florent as a sacrifice to R'hllor to ensure favorable winds, Stannis takes most of his remaining army and sails north to the Wall to relieve the Wildlings' threat on Castle Black.  Stannis' sudden arrival at the Wall catches Mance Rayder, the King-Beyond-the-Wall, by surprise, and his cavalry routs the whole Wildling host with few casualties.  Afterwards, he remains at Castle Black to negotiate settlement over the Wildling prisoners and offers to legitimise Eddard Stark's bastard son Jon Snow as the new lord of Winterfell if Jon swears loyalty to him and joins the fight against House Bolton.  Despite being tempted, Jon declines the offer as he has made an oath binding him to serve the Night's Watch and does not want Winterfell's godswood to be burned by Melisandre.  Later, Stannis pressures the Night's Watch to finish electing a new Lord Commander, and Jon is eventually elected through secret lobbying by Samwell Tarly.

A Feast for Crows and A Dance with Dragons 

Stannis sends ravens to the Northern houses asking for their support in the name of the legitimate king, but only House Karstark and a small faction of House Umber swear allegiance.  Stannis has Mance Rayder burned at the stake, and most of the Wildlings end up bending the knee to Stannis, although Stannis is unaware that Melisandre had used blood magic to disguise Mance as his lieutenant, the Lord of Bones, and vice versa. To rally the northern houses to his side, Stannis intends to attack House Bolton's castle The Dreadfort with the help of Arnolf Karstark, castellan of Karhold.  In reality, Arnolf is working with the Boltons, hoping to entrap Stannis and have his great-nephew Harrion Karstark (who is the heir of Karhold and captured by House Lannister as hostage) executed, so his branch of the family can take control of Karhold.  Jon Snow, however, advises Stannis to march west instead and attack the Ironborn invaders, so that he can rally the Northern lords in the west coast and the northern mountain clans.  In exchange, Jon wants the Wildling prisoners so he can reinforce the defense of the Wall.  Stannis accepts Jon's counsel and defeats the Ironborn holding Deepwood Motte and taking Asha Greyjoy captive.  He restores the castle to House Glover, thus winning their support and that of the nearby House Mormont.  He then marches on Winterfell to confront the Boltons, joined by the men of Arnolf Karstark and Mors Umber, but his army is waylaid by heavy snows and forced to camp at a small crofter's village three days' marching away from Winterfell.

Some time later, Jon Snow receives a letter allegedly written by Ramsay Bolton, claiming that Stannis has been defeated and killed, though it is unknown how much of the letter is true or whether it was even written by Ramsay.  George R. R. Martin confirmed to a fan in 2015 that Stannis is still alive in the books.

The Winds of Winter 

In December 2011, Martin posted a sample chapter from the yet-unfinished sixth book The Winds of Winter, told from Theon Greyjoy's viewpoint, where Stannis is actively and efficiently preparing for the looming battle against the Bolton-Frey alliance.  He secures a loan by signing a blood contract with the Braavosi banker Tycho Nestoris, whose convoy managed to find Stannis' army, and plans to immediately send Tycho back to the Wall for safety.  Tycho also brought along a message from Jon Snow informing Stannis of Arnolf Karstark's planned treachery, after which Stannis arrested Arnolf, his son Arthor and his three grandsons and plans to execute them.  He also subdued Tybald, the Dreadfort maester, who out of fear confesses that he has already revealed Stannis's position to the Boltons in Winterfell.

Stannis then sends Ser Justin Massey to escort Tycho and the escaped "Arya Stark" back to Castle Black to reunite her with Jon Snow, in gratitude for Jon's counsel of gathering the northern mountain clans. Massey is to then travel to Braavos and use a loan from the Iron Bank to hire twenty thousand sellswords for Stannis.

Stannis then interrogates Theon for information regarding the Boltons' military strength.  When Theon taunts Stannis for not taking Ramsay seriously enough, Stannis confidently reveals that he already has a battle plan to utilize the terrain against the incoming Frey army.  Stannis next receives Asha Greyjoy, and informs her that her brother Theon must be executed, as showing him mercy would mean losing all of the northmen. To spare Theon the agony of death by burning, Asha pleads with Stannis to personally behead him before a weirwood tree in the tradition of the northmen.

TV adaptation 

Stannis Baratheon is played by Stephen Dillane in the television adaption of the series of books.

Season 2 

Stannis falls under the influence of Melisandre, a priestess of R'hllor who believes Stannis is the reincarnation of a legendary hero from her religion. After Robert's death, Stannis claims himself the true heir to the Iron Throne as Cersei's children are bastards born of incest. However, most of the Baratheon bannermen support the claim of the younger but far more charismatic Renly. Stannis confronts Renly and offers to make him his heir if he supports him, but Renly refuses, only using the negotiations as an opportunity to mock his brother, and intending to kill Stannis in battle the next day. Melisandre, who had seduced Stannis, gives birth to a shadow baby bearing Stannis' face that kills Renly, and many of Renly's bannermen immediately swear allegiance to Stannis. He then attacks King's Landing by sailing up Blackwater Bay. Stannis' force breaches the walls, but due to Tyrion Lannister's use of wildfire and the arrival of last-minute Lannister and Tyrell reinforcements, he is defeated. Nonetheless, he is convinced to continue fighting by Melisandre, and is further convinced by her magic as she shows him a vision of a battle in the flames.

Season 3 
Stannis acquires one of Robert's bastards, Gendry, from the Brotherhood Without Banners and plans to sacrifice him to further his quest for the Iron Throne. After Davos Seaworth questions his course of action, Stannis has three leeches drawn with Gendry's blood and throws them into a fire, calling for the death of Robb Stark, Balon Greyjoy and Joffrey Baratheon. Upon the news of Robb's death, Davos releases Gendry to prevent him from being sacrificed. Stannis subsequently sentences Davos to death but is swayed by Melisandre, who encourages him to travel North to aid the Night's Watch against the White Walkers emerging from beyond the Wall.

Season 4 
Stannis hears of Joffrey's death and chastises Davos again for releasing Gendry and not finding him a suitable army, prompting Davos to write to the Iron Bank of Braavos in Stannis' name to help pay for an army. The Iron Bank nearly refuses Stannis' request, but Davos manages to convince them that Stannis is the only one they can turn to since Tywin Lannister is nearing old age. Stannis and his army arrive at the Wall shortly after the Battle of Castle Black, interrupting a parley between Jon Snow and Mance Rayder and crushing the wildling force. Stannis learns that Jon is Ned Stark's son, and on Jon's advice, he places Mance and his men under arrest. He is later present at the funeral of the Night's Watch brothers who died during the Battle for Castle Black.

Season 5 
Stannis begins plans to retake the North from Roose Bolton, hoping to recruit Mance's wildling army, if Mance will bend the knee to him. Mance refuses, and Stannis has him burnt at the stake. Stannis offers to legitimise Jon as a Stark to win the loyalty of the Northerners who refuse to recognise Stannis as their king, but Jon decides to remain loyal to his vows to the Night's Watch. Stannis marches on Winterfell, but his army is delayed by a large snowstorm. In the chaos Ramsay Bolton and his men infiltrate Stannis's camp, and destroy all supplies and horses. Melisandre persuades a reluctant Stannis to sacrifice Shireen to ensure victory. Although the snowstorm lifts, half of Stannis's army deserts him, Selyse commits suicide out of guilt, and Melisandre flees to Castle Black. Stannis decides to complete the march on foot. As his army arrives at Winterfell, it is swiftly defeated by a cavalry charge led by Ramsay Bolton. Stannis survives the battle, but is confronted by Brienne of Tarth, a former member of Renly's Kingsguard. Stannis confesses to killing Renly with blood magic, and Brienne executes him, telling Stannis she is killing him in the name of the 'rightful' King Renly.

Critical reception 
The English actor Stephen Dillane has received positive reviews for his performance as Stannis Baratheon, especially in the fifth season. On her review for "Sons of the Harpy", Sarah Hughes of The Guardian wrote, "Stephen Dillane has always been wonderful at showing us the core of this rigid, complex man." His performance on the same episode also received positive reviews from Vulture. Harri Sargeant of Hypable wrote, "Stephen Dillane has always been one of the classiest actors on the show, and his last moments as the King Who Almost Was saw as commanding a performance as ever." In her review for "Mother's Mercy", Meghan O'Keefe of Decider wrote, "Whether you like Stannis or not, you have to admit that Stephen Dillane delivered a monumental performance this season." Cindy Davis of Pajiba wrote "After Shireen's seemingly pointless death, it's a testament to Stephen Dillane's phenomenal skills that we could feel anything at all for a man who watched his daughter burned alive." Nick Steinberg of Goliath  wrote, "Credit has to go to Stephen Dillane for his performance, especially in these last few episodes where he's had to convey a form of grim tragedy that's effectively conveyed the character's downfall."  For his part, Dillane expressed misgivings about his performance, telling The Times newspaper, "I didn't know what I was doing until we'd finished filming and it was too late. The damage had been done. I thought no one would believe in me and I was rather disheartened by the end. I felt I'd built the castle on non-existent foundations.”

Family tree of House Baratheon

References

Sources
 

A Song of Ice and Fire characters
Literary characters introduced in 1996
Fictional filicides
Fictional fratricides
Fictional kings
Fictional knights
Fictional lords and ladies
Fictional people sentenced to death
Fictional revolutionaries
Fictional military strategists
Fictional swordfighters
Fictional war veterans
Male characters in literature
Television characters introduced in 2012
Male characters in television